Cumbria Coast is one of England's Marine Conservation Zones. It was designated in 2013, and is one of a number of such zones off the coast of Cumbria. 

The MCZ covers the stretch of sea from Whitehaven down to the mouth of the Ravenglass Estuary.  It includes the sea off Sellafield (the nuclear fuel reprocessing and nuclear decommissioning site), and off St Bees Head.

Fauna
The MCZ protects underwater habitats and animals such as the honeycomb worm.

St Bees Head, where there is an RSPB reserve, is an important breeding site for sea birds.

Extension
There was concern that the MCZ as originally designated did not protect enough of the foraging grounds of sea birds.
In 2019 an addition was agreed.

See also
At the time Cumbria Coast was designated the other MCZs in Cumbria were:
 Allonby Bay
 West of Walney

References 

Marine reserves of England
Nature reserves in Cumbria
Protected areas established in 2013